Stefán Logi Magnússon (born 5 September 1980) is an Icelandic international footballer and currently goalkeeper at Fylkir. He made his debut with the Icelandic national team in a tournament in Malta in February 2008 against Belarus.

Club career
Stefán started his career playing football at Víkingur Reykjavik, before he was picked up by Bayern Munich as a young prospect. Not making the grade in Munich, Stefán moved around a lot in his career, passing through Denmark, Sweden, England and several stops on Iceland.

Lillestrøm SK
In July 2009, Stefán was picked up on a loan deal by Lillestrøm from KR, a deal that sent LSK-goalkeeping prospect André Hansen the other way. Stefán's move was shortly thereafter made permanent. Stefán made his first team debut against Vålerenga on 16 October 2009. He made several good saves and was named man of the match. He finished the season as Lillestrøm's first choice goalkeeper.

Career statistics

References

External links
Info on Stefan Logi at LSK homepage
Stefan Logi Magnusson at Melar Sport homepage
Official homepage of Stefan Logi Magnusson at Facebook

1980 births
Living people
Stefan Logi Magnusson
Stefan Logi Magnusson
Stefan Logi Magnusson
Stefan Logi Magnusson
Stefan Logi Magnusson
Lillestrøm SK players
Stefan Logi Magnusson
Stefan Logi Magnusson
Stefan Logi Magnusson
Eliteserien players
Norwegian First Division players
Expatriate footballers in Norway
Expatriate footballers in Sweden
Expatriate men's footballers in Denmark
Expatriate footballers in Germany
Stefan Logi Magnusson
Association football goalkeepers